The Bellairs Research Institute, located on the Caribbean island of Barbados, was founded in 1954 as a field-station for McGill University. Initial funding was from a bequest by British naval commander, Carlyon Bellairs, for whom the institute is named. Bellairs is located in Holetown, next to Folkestone Marine Park and Museum, on the western beach of the island.

Initially founded as a marine biology field station, it is also currently used for undergraduates to partake in a Barbados Field Study Semester (BFSS). Environmental Engineering, International Development Studies and Environmental Studies are some of the areas it caters to.

Bellairs runs numerous McGill University field-courses and workshops throughout the year, including Applied Tropical Ecology, Geography, and the Barbados Field Study Semester. Bellairs also holds annual field courses from other universities from around the world including the University of Toronto (marine biology) and Western Michigan University (archeology).

Bellairs participated in testing McGill University's AQUA project – the world's first robot capable of walking and swimming underwater.

The main campus of McGill University is in Montreal, Quebec, Canada.

External links
The Bellairs Research Institute of McGill University
McGill University
History of the Bellairs Research Institute
Bellairs historical photos, newspaper clippings etc

Footnotes

McGill University
Canada–Caribbean relations
Barbados–Canada relations
Saint James, Barbados
Education in Barbados
Educational organisations based in Barbados
Oceanographic organizations
Marine biology
1954 establishments in Barbados
Educational institutions established in 1954